A Private Island is a 1964 Australian television play. It was written by Brisbane author Chris Gardner (real name Marjorie Gardner) and was directed by Henri Safran.

Premise
Set in Sydney, Ben Clayburn is a real estate agent whose two children are grown up and settled. Ben decides to buy an island off the coast of Queensland and live there with his wife. His son Don has other ideas. His daughter wants to go to work to support her artist husband.

Cast
John Gray as Ben Clayburn
Marion Johns as Viv
Brian Young as Don Clayburn
Lola Brooks as Jean 
Alexander Can
Patricia Hill
Roberta Hunt
Guy Le Claire as Mark

Production
The show was shot in Sydney. Marion Jones, who played the wife, had recently appeared in A Season in Hell for Safran. It was writer Chris Garner's third TV play after Dark Under the Sun and The House of Mancello.

Reception
The Canberra Times said  the play "was bogged down with a dull pedestrian script. The basic idea had possibilities but the writer needs to learn about his craft, especially the art of creating characters through the dialogue. The actors were uninteresting."

The Sydney Morning Herald said "For stupefying banality of idea and sentiment it would have been hard to surpass Chris Gardner's homiletic Private Island", saying "the remorseless predictability of the play's action and dialogue must have ended even the most sympathetic viewer's attempt to accept it as other than a moralistic charade."

Radio version
Gardner also adapted the play for radio for the ABC. It aired in 1965 starring Richard Meikle as the agent. Reviewing that production the Sydney Morning Herald said "the players overcame the limitations of script to involve the listener" adding Gardner "wrote from confused values. She tried to present an aging real estate man trying to get away from it all but held back by sense of responsibility. In fact. Dad was held to the treadmill by his son's forgery which left the old man with no choice" arguing that if the writer had "snipped away the sub-plots and cut the thing to a halfhour comment on how people meet the arrows of fate, she would have a play."

References

External links

Australian television plays
1964 television plays